James Bond is a 1999 Indian Malayalam-language comedy film directed by Baiju Kottarakkara and starring Kalabhavan Mani,Premkumar,Bheeman Raghu, Indrans, Abi,Vani Viswanath, Janardhanan and   
NL Balakrishnan.The film is a remake of the 1995 Telugu film Sisindri which itself was a remake of the 1994 American film Baby's Day Out. It was filmed mainly in New Delhi.

Despite the film's title, it is in no way related to the James Bond film series nor an adaptation of the novels by Ian Fleming.

Premise
Following the bankruptcy of their local business, five friends go into hiding only to stumble upon a baby who changes their lives.

Cast
Kalabhavan Mani as Mathappan
 Premkumar as Unnithan
 Bheeman Raghu as Hajiyar
 Indrans as Shankarankutty
 Abi as Sundaran
Janardhanan as Kunnamkulam Rappai
 Vani Viswanath as Lucy, Sibi's wife
 Ratheesh as Sibi Tharakan, baby's Father
 Philomina as Aleyammachedathi
 T. S. Raju as Mathai
 Tony as Shiju, police officer
 Iqbal as the I.T guy
 NL Balakrishnan as Ayyappan 
 Sidharaj as Raja, Kidnapper #1
 Baiju Ezhupunna as Charlie, kidnapper #2
 Juhi Chawla as the baby's Mother (photo presence)

Soundtrack
The film's Music Director by Berni Ignatious. Lyrics by Gireesh Puthenchery.

External links
 
 James Bond at the Malayalam Movie Database

1990s Malayalam-language films
Films scored by Berny–Ignatius
Indian comedy films
Films about child abduction in India
Child superheroes
Films about babies